Frederick Darrell Bunt  (3 July 1902 – 31 October 1977) was Chaplain of the Fleet and Archdeacon of the Royal Navy from 1956 to 1960.

Educated at the City of London School and St Chad's College, Durham, Bunt was ordained in 1927. After  curacies St Luke's, Victoria Docks and St Augustine's, Wembley Park he became a Chaplain in the Royal Navy. Amongst others he served HMS President (as Chaplain to Leonard Coulshaw, the Chaplain of the Fleet), HMS Excellent, HMS Suffolk, the RN College at Dartmouth and HM Dockyard, Portsmouth before becoming head of the service. An Honorary Chaplain to the Queen, he died on 31 October 1977.

References

External links

H.M.S. ALBION Commissioning Service 
The parish of St. Luke, Victoria Docks
St Augustine’s Wembley Park Church Web Site

1902 births
1977 deaths
People educated at the City of London School
Alumni of St Chad's College, Durham
Officers of the Order of the British Empire
Honorary Chaplains to the Queen
Chaplains of the Fleet
Companions of the Order of the Bath